Maxim Vyacheslavovich Mironov (born 30 September 1981 in Tula), is a Russian tenor, best known for his interpretation of the bel canto repertoire.  In 2001, he joined the Helikon Opera Theatre in Moscow, where he made his operatic debut in André Grétry's opera Pierre le Grand.  Mironov won the 2nd Prize at the Neue Stimmen international singing competition in Germany in 2003. In Europe Mironov has performed in many opera houses.

He has sung at a number of summer festivals, including Glyndebourne Festival Opera, Rossini Opera Festival in Pesaro, Rossini in Wildbad Festival, the Festival of Stresa and the Aix-en-Provence Festival.

Mironov made his U.S. debut in 2011 with the Los Angeles Opera, California. Since then he has performed at the Washington National Opera.

Discography 
Maxim Mironov has numerous recordings on CD and DVD for Dynamic, Bongiovanni, Bel Air Classic, Naxos Records and Opus Arte.

La Cenerentola, Rossini, (2011, DVD) as Don Ramiro
with José Maria Lo Monaco, Maxim Mironov, Paolo Bordogna, Roberto de Candia Nicola Ulivieri, director Evelino Pidò;  Dynamic

La Donna del lago, Rossini (2008, CD) as Uberto/Giacomo V
with Sonia Ganassi,  Maxim Mironov,  Marianna Pizzolato,  Ferdinand von Bothmer,  Olga Peretyatko, Wojciech Adalbert Gierlach,  Stefan Cifolelli; director Alberto Zedda; Naxos

L'Italiana in Algeri, Rossini (2006, DVD and CD)  as Lindoro
with Christianne Stotijn, Maxim Mironov, Marco Vinco, Giorgio Caoduro, director Riccardo Frizza; BelAir Classiques

La Cenerentola, Rossini, (Glyndebourne, 2005 DVD) as Don Ramiro
with Raquela Sheeran, Lucia Cirillo, Ruxandra Donose, Nathan Berg, director Vladimir Jurowski;  Opus Arte

Maometto II, Rossini (2005, DVD)  as Erisso
with Lorenzo Regazzo, Carmen Giannatasio, Maxim Mironov, Annarita Gemmabella; La Fenice Theatre Orchestra, director Claudio Scimone; Dynamic

Pierre le Grand, Gretry (2003, DVD) Title role
Maxim Mironov, Elena Voznessenskaya, Nikolai Galin, Chorus and Orchestra of Helikon Opera; director Sergey Stadler; Arthaus

Opera and Ballet Highlights, "The Blu-Ray Experience" (DVD) Opus Arte

Selected repertoire

Count Almaviva in Il barbiere di Siviglia (Gioachino Rossini)
Prince Ramiro in La Cenerentola (Rossini)
Lindoro in L'italiana in Algeri (Rossini)
Count Libenskoff in Il viaggio a Reims (Rossini)
Narciso in Il turco in Italia (Rossini)
Comte Ory in Le comte Ory (Rossini)
Rodrigo in Otello (Rossini)
Ricciardo in Ricciardo e Zoraide (Rossini)
Dorvil in La scala di seta (Rossini)
Alberto in La gazzetta (Rossini)
Idreno in Semiramide (Rossini)
Tenor in Stabat Mater (Rossini)
Fenton in Falstaff (Giuseppe Verdi)
Castor in Castor et Pollux (Jean-Philippe Rameau)
Orphée in Orfeo ed Euridice (Christoph Willibald Gluck)
Achille in Iphigénie en Aulide (Gluck)
Chapelou in Le postillon de Lonjumeau (Adolphe Adam)
Tebaldo in I Capuleti e i Montecchi (Vincenzo Bellini)
Arturo in I puritani (Bellini)
Elvino in La sonnambula (Bellini)
Nemorino in L'elisir d'amore (Gaetano Donizetti)
Edgardo in Lucia di Lammermoor (Donizetti)
Leicester in Maria Stuarda (Donizetti)
Ernesto in Don Pasquale (Donizetti)
Tonio in La fille du régiment (Donizetti)
Roberto Devereux in Roberto Devereux (Donizetti)
Don Ottavio in Don Giovanni (Wolfgang Amadeus Mozart)
Ferrando in Così fan tutte (Mozart)
Belmonte in Die Entführung aus dem Serail (Mozart)
Marzio in Mitridate, re di Ponto (Mozart)

References

External links
Official fan page; Biography; Upcoming performances
Official Biography, Askonas Holt
Biography, Partial discography
Interview for GB Opera Magazine
Neue Stimmen Prize Winners 2003

Russian operatic tenors
Living people
1981 births
People from Tula, Russia
Gnessin State Musical College alumni
21st-century Russian male opera singers